Arthur Miller (1915–2005) was an American playwright and essayist.

Arthur Miller may also refer to:

Arthur Miller (cinematographer) (1895–1970), American cinematographer
Arthur G. Miller (born 1942), American art historian and Mesoamerican archaeologist
Arthur I. Miller, professor of history and philosophy of science at University College London
Arthur J. Miller (1887–?), Wisconsin State Assemblyman
Art Miller Jr. (1946–2020), Michigan state senator
Arthur L. Miller (1892–1967), U.S. Representative from Nebraska
A. M. Miller (Arthur McQuiston Miller, 1861–1929), American zoology professor and football coach
Arthur R. Miller (born 1934), American law professor and theorist
Arthur William Miller (1854–1934), politician in Newfoundland
Arthur Miller, a character in the film Ah, Wilderness!
 Dan Miller (Canadian politician) (Arthur Daniel Miller, born 1944), premier of British Columbia

See also
Arthur Millar (1649–1727), churchman
Arthur Millar (footballer) (1877–1929), Scottish footballer